Bryotropha elegantula is a moth of the family Gelechiidae. It is found in Qinghai, China.

References

Moths described in 1997
elegantula
Moths of Asia